Yu Rongguang (born 30 August 1958), also known as Ringo Yu, is a Chinese actor and martial artist. He is best known for the title role in Iron Monkey along with Donnie Yen as well as being featured in films such as The East Is Red, My Father Is a Hero, and Musa.

Yu is also known for appearing in roles for films with Jackie Chan such as New Police Story and The Myth and in North America Shanghai Noon and the 2010 remake of The Karate Kid.

Biography
Yu Rongguang was born on August 30, 1958, to Yu Mingkui, a Peking opera actor. He has two younger brothers.

Filmography

Film

Television

References

External links

1958 births
Male actors from Beijing
Living people
Chinese wushu practitioners
Sportspeople from Beijing
Chinese male film actors
Chinese male television actors
20th-century Chinese male actors
21st-century Chinese male actors
20th-century Chinese  male singers
Singers from Beijing
Chinese male Peking opera actors